Agape English Language Institute for Internationals (Agape or AELI) is a South Carolina company offering ESL services to individuals and businesses. It is owned and operated by Dr. Rajarathnam (Raj) Aluri and his wife Kathy Aluri.

History

AELI was incorporated in 1989 by Dr. Rajarathnam S. Aluri, who came to the United States as an international student in September 1976. 

In 1993, AELI signed a cooperative agreement with Limestone College in Gaffney, South Carolina to offer classes on the school's campus. The first employee was hired in September 1993 to begin the program, and the first class was held that month on the Limestone College's main campus in Gaffney, SC. Subsequently, AELI began offering intensive English classes in Columbia in January 1994, and in Charlotte, NC in August 1994. In December 1997, AELI and Limestone College revised their agreement, thus facilitating AELI's decision to begin offering classes affiliated with the school's Block Program (Limestone's continuing education program) in Columbia, Greenville, and Charleston. The first classes in Greenville and Charleston were offered in June 1998. Classes have also been held at various companies in South Carolina. 

In January 2004, AELI's Columbia program obtained permission from the United States Bureau of Citizenship and Immigration Services to issue its own I-20s to students coming from abroad (AELI's cooperative agreement with Limestone College ended in May 2004). AELI received the same authorization to issue I-20s for its Greenville program in August 2004. In May 2004, AELI closed its Charleston program in an effort to focus resources on the Columbia and Greenville programs.

Accreditation and Certification 
Agape English Language Institute is accredited by the Accrediting Council for Continuing Education and Training and is committed to ACCET Standards for intensive English programs. ACCET is approved by the U.S. Secretary of Education as a national accrediting agency for institutions of continuing education in the U.S.

Agape is certified by the Student and Exchange Visitor Program (SEVP) to enroll F-1 students in the United States.

Campuses 
AELI currently has 2 locations in South Carolina:

 Greenville Campus - in Greenville, South Carolina
 Columbia Campus - in Columbia, South Carolina

References

External links 
 Official Website

Education in Greenville, South Carolina
Education in Columbia, South Carolina
Companies based in South Carolina
Education in South Carolina